Mary Alice Rich is an American composer. She went to high school in Fairmont, Minnesota and studied violin under Paul Rolland and Sergiu Luca at the University of Illinois. She was a performing artist until a combination of a serious debilitating illness, strength of character, love of music, and loving support from friends and family transformed her into a composer.
Her first opera, Wading Home, is based on her friend Rosalyn Story's novel of the same name. It was first performed at the Dallas City Performance Hall on April 2, 2015.

References

External links 
 maryalicerich.com

American women composers
21st-century American composers
Living people
Year of birth missing (living people)
People from Fairmont, Minnesota
21st-century American women musicians
21st-century women composers